Crown Prince Frederik Island is an island in Nunavut, Canada. It is located off the southern coast of western Baffin Island, in the Qikiqtaaluk Region's side of the Gulf of Boothia.

External links 
 Sea islands: Atlas of Canada; Natural Resources Canada
 

Islands of the Gulf of Boothia
Uninhabited islands of Qikiqtaaluk Region
Islands of Baffin Island